Pat Jabbar is a producer, musician and founder of the record label Barraka el Farnatshi. He is of Swiss, Russian and French descent.

Born in Hamburg, Germany, he grew up in Basel, Switzerland. In 1984 he discovered Arabic music in Israel. One year later, he went to Morocco, where he met many musicians. In 1988, the first CD "El Buya" by Aisha Kandisha's Jarring Effects was published on Barraka E.F. In 1992, he sent the CD to Bill Laswell, who wanted to work with Pat Jabbar and also helped him establish his record company. The name Jabbar derives from abdeljabbar which was the name given to Pat Jabbar by his Moroccan friends. Most of the CDs published on Barraka E.F. are produced by Pat Jabbar himself and his collaborators; he also publishes CDs he licensed from other companies, among them works by Hamid Baroudi, Maniacs vs. Sharkiat and Hypnotix. Pat Jabbar also discovered Turkish rappers Makale from Basel and produced some of their music. He worked with French-Arabic chanteuse Sapho (singer), co-producing her album "Digital Sheikha". Bill Laswell produced tracks for Aisha Kandisha's Jarring Effects (the ur-posse from which most of Barraka's projects and groups came), Ahlam and Azzddine. His newest group Maghrebika consists of himself and two Algerians now living in Switzerland, namely Abdelkader Belkacem and Abdelaziz Lamari. Bill Laswell once again is featured as a guest musician.

References

External links
http://www.maroc.net/barraka
http://www.angelfire.com/id/laotan/jabbar.html
http://www.myspace.com/maghrebika Maghrebika, Pat Jabbar's new group, on Myspace

Year of birth missing (living people)
Living people